This is a list of fighter aces in World War II from Czechoslovakia. For other countries see List of World War II aces by country

B

C

D

F

H

J

K

M

P

S

V

 
World War II flying aces
World War II flying aces
Czechoslovakia